Ancylandrena is a genus of mining bees in the family Andrenidae. There are about five described species in Ancylandrena.

Species
These five species belong to the genus Ancylandrena:
 Ancylandrena atoposoma (Cockerell, 1934)
 Ancylandrena koebelei (Timberlake, 1951)
 Ancylandrena larreae (Timberlake, 1951) (creosote bush ancylandrena)
 Ancylandrena rozeni Zavortink, 1994
 Ancylandrena timberlakei Zavortink, 1974

References

Further reading

External links

 

Andreninae
Articles created by Qbugbot